The 2010–11 Georgia Tech Yellow Jackets men's basketball team represented Georgia Tech during the 2010–11 NCAA Division I men's basketball season. The Yellow Jackets, led by 11th-year head coach Paul Hewitt, played their home games at the Alexander Memorial Coliseum and were members of the Atlantic Coast Conference. They finished the season 13–18 and 5–11 in ACC play to finish in eleventh place. They lost to Virginia Tech in the first round of the ACC Basketball tournament. Following the conclusion of the season, Georgia Tech fired their head coach, Paul Hewitt, after eleven seasons.

Previous season
The Yellow Jackets finished the 2009–10 season 23–13 overall, 7–9 in ACC play. Due to a strong run in the ACC tournament, the Yellow Jackets were invited to the NCAA tournament where, as the ten seed, they beat the seven seed Oklahoma State before falling to the two seed Ohio State in the round of 32.

Roster

Schedule

|-
!colspan=12 style=| Regular season

|-
!colspan=12 style=| ACC tournament

References

Georgia Tech Yellow Jackets men's basketball seasons
G
Georgia Tech Yellow Jackets men's basketball team
Georgia Tech Yellow Jackets men's basketball team